Gungrave (2002) video game created by Yasuhiro Nightow

Gungrave: Overdose (2004) video game

Gungrave G.O.R.E. (2022)  upcoming video game

Gungrave (TV series), a 2003 anime television series in the same setting as the 2002 video game

"Gungrave", a song by Erra from their 2021 self-titled album